TV Bingo is an Australian television series of 1965. Aired in Sydney only on station TCN-9, it was a half-hour game show in which viewers at home played bingo for prizes. It was hosted by David Paterson, and aired in a daytime time-slot.

Controversy
The legality of the series was questioned, given that the prizes given exceeded the legal limits for bingo games, additionally the series was blamed for causing a decline in the takings by charitable bingo games. Eventually TCN-9 agreed to cease broadcasting the series, while ATN-7, which had introduced a similar show, suspended their series after three episodes. A similar programme airing in Newcastle was also suspended.

References

External links
 

1965 Australian television series debuts
1965 Australian television series endings
1960s Australian game shows
Black-and-white Australian television shows
English-language television shows